Ischnothyreus is a genus of oonopid spiders generally between 1.25 (smallest male) and 2.25 mm (largest female) long. They have six eyes; in at least the species I. peltifer and I. omus, the males have a curious knob or hook at the base of the fang.

Species
 it contains 121 species:

 Ischnothyreus aculeatus (Simon, 1893) — Philippines
 Ischnothyreus an Tong & Li, 2016 — Singapore
 Ischnothyreus arcus Edward & Harvey, 2014 — Queensland
 Ischnothyreus ascifer Richard, 2016 — Sumatra
 Ischnothyreus auritus Tong & Li, 2013 — China
 Ischnothyreus baltenspergerae Richard, 2016 — Java
 Ischnothyreus balu Kranz-Baltensperger, 2011 — Borneo
 Ischnothyreus barratus Edward & Harvey, 2014 — Queensland
 Ischnothyreus barus Kranz-Baltensperger, 2011 — Borneo
 Ischnothyreus bauri Richard, 2016 — Java
 Ischnothyreus bifidus Edward & Harvey, 2014 — Queensland
 Ischnothyreus binorbis Edward & Harvey, 2014 — Queensland
 Ischnothyreus bipartitus Simon, 1893 — Sri Lanka
 Ischnothyreus boonjee Edward & Harvey, 2014 — Queensland
 Ischnothyreus browni Chickering, 1968 — Costa Rica
 Ischnothyreus brunneus Tong & Li, 2016 — Singapore
 Ischnothyreus bualveus Edward & Harvey, 2014 — Queensland
 Ischnothyreus bupariorbis Edward & Harvey, 2014 — Queensland
 Ischnothyreus campanaceus Tong & Li, 2013 — China
 Ischnothyreus chippy Ranasinghe & Benjamin, 2018 — Sri Lanka
 Ischnothyreus collingwoodi Edward & Harvey, 2014 — Queensland
 Ischnothyreus comicus Edward & Harvey, 2014 — Queensland
 Ischnothyreus concavus Richard, 2016 — Sumatra
 Ischnothyreus corniculatum Edward & Harvey, 2014 — Queensland
 Ischnothyreus cornuatus Edward & Harvey, 2014 — Queensland
 Ischnothyreus corollacous Tong & Li, 2013 — Laos
 Ischnothyreus crenulatus Edward & Harvey, 2014 — Queensland
 Ischnothyreus cristiformis Tong & Li, 2021 — China
 Ischnothyreus culleni Edward & Harvey, 2014 — Queensland
 Ischnothyreus dactylinus Tong & Li, 2016 — Singapore
 Ischnothyreus danum Kranz-Baltensperger, 2011 — Borneo
 Ischnothyreus darwini Edward & Harvey, 2014 — Northern Territory
 Ischnothyreus deccanensis Tikader & Malhotra, 1974 — India
 Ischnothyreus deelemanae Kranz-Baltensperger, 2011 — Borneo
 Ischnothyreus digitus Edward & Harvey, 2014 — Queensland
 Ischnothyreus eacham Edward & Harvey, 2014 — Queensland
 Ischnothyreus elvis Kranz-Baltensperger, 2011 — Borneo
 Ischnothyreus eungella Edward & Harvey, 2014 — Queensland
 Ischnothyreus falcatus Tong & Li, 2013 — China
 Ischnothyreus falcifer Kranz-Baltensperger, 2011 — Borneo
 Ischnothyreus flabellifer Kranz-Baltensperger, 2011 — Borneo
 Ischnothyreus flagellichelis Xu, 1989 — China
 Ischnothyreus flippi Kranz-Baltensperger, 2011 — Borneo
 Ischnothyreus florence Edward & Harvey, 2014 — Northern Territory
 Ischnothyreus florifer Kranz-Baltensperger, 2011 — Borneo
 Ischnothyreus fobor Kranz-Baltensperger, 2011 — Borneo
 Ischnothyreus gigeri Richard, 2016 — Java
 Ischnothyreus habeggeri Richard, 2016 — Sumatra
 Ischnothyreus hamatus Edward & Harvey, 2014 — Queensland
 Ischnothyreus hanae Tong & Li, 2013 — China
 Ischnothyreus haymozi Richard, 2016 — Sumatra
 Ischnothyreus hooki Kranz-Baltensperger, 2011 — Borneo
 Ischnothyreus hoplophorus Edward & Harvey, 2014 — Queensland
 Ischnothyreus hponkanrazi Tong & Li, 2020 — Myanmar
 Ischnothyreus jianglangi Tong & Li, 2020 — Myanmar
 Ischnothyreus jivani Benoit, 1979 — Seychelles
 Ischnothyreus jojo Kranz-Baltensperger, 2011 — Borneo
 Ischnothyreus julianneae Edward & Harvey, 2014 — Queensland
 Ischnothyreus kalimantan Kranz-Baltensperger, 2011 — Borneo
 Ischnothyreus kentigensis Tong & Li, 2014 — Taiwan
 Ischnothyreus ker Edward & Harvey, 2014 — Queensland
 Ischnothyreus khamis Saaristo & van Harten, 2006 — Yemen
 Ischnothyreus lanutoo Marples, 1955 — Samoa
 Ischnothyreus ligulatus Richard, 2016 — Java
 Ischnothyreus linzhiensis Hu, 2001 — China
 Ischnothyreus lucidus Richard, 2016 — Sumatra
 Ischnothyreus lymphaseus Simon, 1893 — Sri Lanka
 Ischnothyreus mangun Tong & Li, 2021 — China
 Ischnothyreus marggii Richard, 2016 — Sumatra
 Ischnothyreus matang Kranz-Baltensperger, 2011 — Borneo
 Ischnothyreus meidamon Edward & Harvey, 2014 — Queensland
 Ischnothyreus mengyang Tong & Li, 2021 — China
 Ischnothyreus meukyawwa Tong & Li, 2020 — Myanmar
 Ischnothyreus microphthalmus Richard, 2016 — Sumatra
 Ischnothyreus montiethi Edward & Harvey, 2014 — Queensland
 Ischnothyreus mulumi Kranz-Baltensperger, 2011 — Borneo
 Ischnothyreus namo Kranz-Baltensperger, 2012 — Malaysia
 Ischnothyreus narutomii (Nakatsudi, 1942) — China, Taiwan, Japan
 Ischnothyreus nentwigorum Richard, 2016 — Java
 Ischnothyreus nourlangie Edward & Harvey, 2014 — Northern Territory
 Ischnothyreus obscurus Richard, 2016 — Sumatra
 Ischnothyreus ovinus Edward & Harvey, 2014 — Queensland
 Ischnothyreus pacificus Roewer, 1963 — Micronesia
 Ischnothyreus peltifer (Simon, 1892) — Tropical Asia. Introduced to North, Central, South America, Britain, Switzerland, Gabon, Seychelles, Madagascar, Hawaii
 Ischnothyreus piricius Edward & Harvey, 2014 — Queensland
 Ischnothyreus poculum Tong & Li, 2016 — Singapore
 Ischnothyreus pterodactyl Edward & Harvey, 2014 — Queensland
 Ischnothyreus puruntatamerii Edward & Harvey, 2014 — Northern Territory
 Ischnothyreus putao Tong & Li, 2020 — Myanmar
 Ischnothyreus qianlongae Tong & Li, 2008 — China
 Ischnothyreus qidaoban Tong & Li, 2021 — China
 Ischnothyreus qiuxing Tong & Li, 2020 — Myanmar, China
 Ischnothyreus raveni Edward & Harvey, 2014 — Queensland
 Ischnothyreus rex Kranz-Baltensperger, 2011 — Borneo
 Ischnothyreus rixi Edward & Harvey, 2014 — Queensland
 Ischnothyreus serapi Kranz-Baltensperger, 2011 — Borneo
 Ischnothyreus serpentinum Saaristo, 2001 — Seychelles, Madagascar, Java
 Ischnothyreus shillongensis Tikader, 1968 — India, Bhutan
 Ischnothyreus sigridae Richard, 2016 — Java
 Ischnothyreus sijiae Tong & Li, 2021 — China
 Ischnothyreus spineus Tong & Li, 2012 — China
 Ischnothyreus stauntoni Edward & Harvey, 2014 — Queensland
 Ischnothyreus subaculeatus Roewer, 1938 — Moluccas
 Ischnothyreus tadetu Tong & Li, 2013 — Laos
 Ischnothyreus tadfane Tong & Li, 2013 — Laos
 Ischnothyreus taunggyi Tong & Li, 2020 — Myanmar
 Ischnothyreus tectorius Tong & Li, 2016 — Singapore
 Ischnothyreus tekek Kranz-Baltensperger, 2012 — Malaysia
 Ischnothyreus tergeminus Liu, Xu & Henrard, 2019 — China
 Ischnothyreus tioman Kranz-Baltensperger, 2012 — Malaysia
 Ischnothyreus tragicus Edward & Harvey, 2014 — Queensland
 Ischnothyreus tumidus Edward & Harvey, 2014 — Queensland
 Ischnothyreus ujungkulon Richard, 2016 — Java
 Ischnothyreus velox Jackson, 1908 — Tropical Asia. Introduced to North, Central, South America, Brazil, Britain, Netherlands, Germany, Egypt, Seychelles, Madagascar, Hawaii
 Ischnothyreus xiaolongha Tong & Li, 2021 — China
 Ischnothyreus xui Tong & Li, 2013 — China
 Ischnothyreus yuanyeae Tong & Li, 2013 — China
 Ischnothyreus yueluensis Yin & Wang, 1984 — China
 Ischnothyreus yunlong Tong & Li, 2021 — China
 Ischnothyreus zhigangi Tong & Li, 2020 — Myanmar
 Ischnothyreus zhoujiayan Tong & Li, 2018 — China

References

 Chickering, A.M. (1968). The genus Ischnothyreus (Araneae, Oonopidae) in Central America and the West Indies. Psyche 75:77-86 PDF

Oonopidae
Spiders of Asia
Spiders of Australia
Spiders of North America
Araneomorphae genera